Madraseye Akbarieh was an old school in Tabriz, north-western Iran.

See also 
 Madrasah
 Saheb ol Amr mosque
 House of Seghat ol Islam
 The Amir Nezam House

References 
 http://www.eachto.ir

Architecture in Iran

Buildings and structures in Tabriz